Alppila is a quarter of Helsinki, Finland. It is located north of the city centre, between the districts of Kallio and Pasila, and together with Harju it forms the district of Alppiharju. Alppila has a population of 4,244 (as of 2005) and an area of 0.60 km². The Linnanmäki amusement park and the Kulttuuritalo (House of Culture) are located in Alppila.

External links

 Alppila website maintained by local organizations

Quarters of Helsinki